Gyrotaenia is a genus of plants in the family Urticaceae.

Species include:

 Gyrotaenia microcarpa (Wedd.) F. & R.
 Gyrotaenia spicata (Wedd.) Wedd.

References

 
Urticaceae genera
Taxonomy articles created by Polbot